Keppel Island can mean:

 Keppel Island, the constituent island that is a part of the larger archipelago of the Falkland Islands
 the Keppel Islands of Australia, including Great Keppel Island
 Keppel Bay Islands National Park
 Keppel Island, Singapore, an island located in Singapore
 Niuatoputapu, an island in Tonga, formerly known as Keppel Island